Americana/Folk Albums (formerly Folk Albums) is a music chart published weekly by Billboard magazine which ranks the top selling "current releases by traditional folk artists, as well as appropriate titles by acoustic-based singer-songwriters" in the United States.  The chart debuted on the issue dated December 5, 2009, as a 15-position chart with its first number-one title being the Bob Dylan Christmas album Christmas in the Heart.

It has since expanded to a 25-position chart. In May 2016, Billboard renamed the chart to "Americana/Folk Albums", with the increasing popularity of Americana music, giving more recognition to acts which lean more towards Americana than folk.

On the year-end Billboard charts, Sigh No More by Mumford & Sons was the best performing album of 2010 and 2011, Babel by Mumford & Sons was the best performing album of 2012 and 2013, All the Little Lights by Passenger was the best performing album of 2014, Hozier by Hozier was the best performing album of 2015, and Traveller by Chris Stapleton was the best performing album of 2016, 2017, 2018, and 2019.

Folk/Americana chart achievements

Albums with most weeks at number one

Artists with most cumulative weeks at number one

Artists with the most number-one albums

See also
List of Billboard number-one Americana/folk albums of the 2010s
List of Billboard number-one Americana/folk albums of the 2020s

References

Billboard charts